Neustadt-Glewe is a German town, in Mecklenburg-Western Pomerania, in the district of Ludwigslust-Parchim.

History
Neustadt-Glewe was mentioned for the first time in a document in 1248.

Hans Axel Holm, a Swedish writer and journalist, documented life in Neustadt-Glewe in the late 1960s when it was part of the German Democratic Republic. In his book The Other Germans: Report From an East German Town, Holm documented various aspects of everyday life in the GDR, such as being an adult who worked at a VEB (industrial state-owned enterprise) or at an LPG (collective farm); being a child or teen going to school and participating in the FDJ (youth organization); being a soldier in the NVA (army); the GDR's relationship with the Soviets, including tensions within the Eastern Bloc and the threat of Soviet interventions; recreation; housing; socialist ideology and administration; the Nazi era and its consequences; interaction with West Germans, including the themes of who left the East, who stayed, and who came to the East; and other topics. LPG farming was big business in the Ludwigslust-Parchim region at the time, and the factories in the area included a large tannery (VEB Lederwerk "August Apfelbaum", which had formerly been a large plant of Adler and Oppenheimer), a hydraulic parts factory (for VEB Hydraulik Nord), and a factory for radio parts and telephone switchboard parts (for VEB Funkmechanik). Neustadt-Glewe was the site of a German-Nazi concentration camp (1944-1945) "KZ Neustadt-Glewe".  Among its prisoners was Stanisława Rachwał, a Polish resistance fighter transferred from Auschwitz-Birkenau.

Sights and monuments

 The Alte Burg, a 13th-century castle, considered to be the oldest military castle in Mecklenburg.
 The Schloss (palace), completed in 1720 in Baroque style, today a hotel.
  Monument to victims of Neustadt-Glewe German-Nazi Concentration Camp

Population development

1855: 1,880
1890: 1,743
1925: 3,202
1984: 7,500
1995: 7,542
2010: 6,547

References

External links
 

Cities and towns in Mecklenburg
Ludwigslust-Parchim
Populated places established in the 13th century
1240s establishments in the Holy Roman Empire
1248 establishments in Europe
Grand Duchy of Mecklenburg-Schwerin